The Semeru, or Mount Semeru, is an active volcano located in East Java, Indonesia. It is located in a subduction zone, where the Indo-Australian plate subducts under the Eurasia plate. It is the highest mountain on the island of Java. The name "Semeru" is derived from Meru, the central world mountain in Hinduism, or Sumeru, the abode of gods. This stratovolcano is also known as Mahameru, meaning "The Great Mountain" in Sanskrit. It is one of the more popular hiking destinations in Indonesia.

Geology
Semeru rises steeply above the coastal plains of eastern Java. Maars containing crater lakes have formed along a line through the summit of the volcano. It was formed south of the overlapping Ajek-ajek and Jambagan calderas. The eruptive products are andesitic. Semeru lies at the south end of the Tengger Volcanic Complex.

Eruptive history
Semeru's eruptive history is extensive. Since 1818, at least 55 eruptions have been recorded (11 of which resulted in fatalities) consisting of both lava flows and pyroclastic flows. All historical eruptions have had a Volcanic Explosivity Index (VEI) of 2 or 3. Semeru has been in a state of near-constant eruption from 1967 to the present.

Semeru is regularly climbed by tourists, usually starting from the village of Ranu Pane to the north, but though non-technical, it can be dangerous. Soe Hok Gie, an Indonesian political activist of the 1960s, died in 1969 from inhaling poisonous gases while hiking on Mount Semeru.

2021 eruption 

On 4 December 2021, Semeru erupted for a second time in the year – the first having been on 16 January 2021. Semeru erupted a third time on 6 December 2021.

At least 57 people died, 104 more were injured, while 23 are unaccounted for. Thousands were displaced.

2022 eruption
A fresh eruption started on 4 December 2022, as monsoon rains collapsed the mountain's lava dome, provoking evacuations.

Evacuation of people was quickly undertaken.

Mythology
Semeru is named after Sumeru, the central world-mountain in Hinduism. As stated in legend, it was transplanted from India to create the island of Java; the tale is recorded in the 15th-century East Javanese work Tantu Pagelaran. It was originally placed in the western part of the island, but that caused the island to tip, so the gods moved it eastward. On that journey, parts kept coming off the lower rim, forming the mountains Lawu, Wilis, Kelud, Kawi, Arjuno and Welirang. The damage thus caused to the foot of the mountain caused it to shake, and the top came off and created Penanggungan as well. Indonesian Hindus also hold a belief that the mountain is the abode of Shiva in Java.

Floral problems

Non-native invasive plants
25 non-native plants have been found in Mount Semeru National Park. The non-native plants, which threaten the endemic local plants, were imported by Dutch botanist Van Steenis, in the colonial era. They include Foeniculum vulgare, Verbena brasiliensis, Chromolaena odorata, and Salvinia molesta.

Vegetable plantations
Mud erosion from surrounding vegetable plantations is adding silt to Ranu Pani Lake, causing the lake to gradually shrink. Research has predicted that the lake will disappear by about 2025, unless the vegetable plantations on the hillsides are replaced with more ecologically sustainable perennials.

See also

List of volcanoes in Indonesia
List of Southeast Asian mountains
List of islands by highest point
Volcanological Survey of Indonesia
Lists of volcanoes

Citations

General sources 
 
 Holt, Claire. Art in Indonesia: Continuities and Change. Ithaca: Cornell University Press, 1967. Page 36 explains the mythological aspect of the mountain.

External links

 Satellite picture by Google Maps
 Early December 2022 eruptions at NASA Earth Observatory 
 Semeru Volcano by Drone

Active volcanoes of Indonesia
Maars of Indonesia
Mountains of East Java
Sacred mountains
Stratovolcanoes of Indonesia
VEI-3 volcanoes
Volcanic crater lakes
Volcanoes of East Java
Holocene stratovolcanoes
Volcanic eruptions in 2022